The Moment Before is a 1916 American silent drama film starring Pauline Frederick. It was produced by Famous Players Film Company and directed by Robert G. Vignola. The film is based on the play The Moment of Death, by Israel Zangwill.

A 35mm nitrate copy of the film is housed at the Cineteca Nazionale film archive in Rome. The print is missing one sequence described as "the opening scenes before the flashback."

Cast
 Pauline Frederick as Madge
 Thomas Holding as Harold
 Frank Losee as Duke of Maldon
 J. W. Johnston as John, the Gypsy 
 Edward Sturgis as Ojoe 
 Henry Hallam as The Bishop

See also
 List of rediscovered films

References

External links

1916 films
1916 drama films
Silent American drama films
American silent feature films
American black-and-white films
Famous Players-Lasky films
American films based on plays
Films directed by Robert G. Vignola
Paramount Pictures films
1910s rediscovered films
Rediscovered American films
1910s English-language films
1910s American films